Killer's Payoff (1958) is the sixth 87th Precinct novel by Ed McBain.

Plot

Sy Kramer, a blackmailer, is shot dead in a 1937-style drive-by execution.  But it is 1958 and Cotton Hawes and Steve Carella have to find out who killed him.  It could have been Lucy Mencken, a rich and respectable lady with a past that included some very unrespectable photographic portraits, or it could have been Edward Schlesser, a manufacturer of soda pop.  Or perhaps it was one of the members of a hunting party that went very wrong.

Characters

This novel is the second to feature the character of Detective Cotton Hawes, newly transferred from the 30th Precinct, an area with 'Big, fancy apartment houses with doormen...But not many homicides.'

1958 American novels
American crime novels
Novels by Evan Hunter